The Mirza Fatali Akhundov State Prize of the Azerbaijan SSR was an award given to cultural figures distinguished in various fields of art in the Azerbaijan SSR.

About 
The award was established on December 15, 1964 for the activities in the fields of fiction, music, theater, fine arts, cinema and journalism in the Azerbaijan SSR. The recipients were awarded the title of "Laureate of Mirza Fatali Akhundov State Prize of the Azerbaijan SSR", a badge, a diploma and a cash prize of 2,500 manat.

The award was presented by the Council of Ministers of the Azerbaijan SSR once every two years on the day of the establishment of the Soviet government in Azerbaijan on the recommendation of the M. F. Akhundov Award Committee. The list of nominees and works nominated for the award was published in the press of the Azerbaijan SSR two months ago.

The first laureates of the prize: Mirza Ibrahimov, Maral Rahmanzadeh, Tofig Kazimov, Tahir Salahov, Gara Garayev, Hokuma Gurbanova, Zeynalov Ali Yusif oglu.

Regulations on Mirza Fatali Akhundov State Prize of the Azerbaijan SSR were adopted on December 15, 1964.

The sketch of the laureate's badge, diploma, as well as the description of the badge were approved on July 26, 1965.

Rewards Committee 
At the time of its establishment, the staff of the M. F. Akhundov Award Committee under the Council of Ministers of the Azerbaijan SSR was as follows:

References 

Awards established in 1964